This is a list of Croatian television related events from 1997.

Events
9 March - E.N.I. are selected to represent Croatia at the 1997 Eurovision Song Contest with their song "Probudi me". They are selected to be the fifth Croatian Eurovision entry during Dora held at the Crystal Ballroom of Hotel Kvarner in Opatija.

Debuts

Television shows

Ending this year

Births

Deaths